Caladenia gertrudae, commonly known as the pale china orchid, is a plant in the orchid family Orchidaceae and is endemic to the south-west of Western Australia. It has a small, oval leaf and one or two pale blue, sweetly-scented flowers. It is similar to Caladenia gemmata but its leaf is green on both surfaces, the flower is scented and the labellum is striped.

Description
Caladenia gertrudae is a terrestrial, perennial, deciduous, herb with an underground tuber. The lateral sepals have about the same dimensions as the dorsal sepal and the petals are slightly shorter and narrower. There are many small, scattered, bead-like calli covering the labellum. Flowering occurs from September to November.

Taxonomy and naming
Caladenia gertrudae was first formally described in 1920 by Carl Ostenfeld and the description was published in Biologiske meddelelser, Kongelige Danske Videnskabernes Selskab from a specimen collected in forest near Yallingup Cave (now Ngilgi Cave).  In 2000, Stephen Hopper and Andrew Brown changed the name to Cyanicula gertrudiae, but in 2015, as a result of studies of molecular phylogenetics Mark Clements changed the name back to Caladenia gertrudae. The specific epithet (gertrudae) honours Carl Ostenfeld's daughter Gertrud.

The Royal Botanic Gardens, Kew uses the spelling Caladenia gertrudiae.

Distribution and habitat
The pale china orchid occurs along the south coast of Western Australia between Albany and Yallingup in the Jarrah Forest and Warren biogeographic regions, growing between sand dunes.

Conservation
Caladenia gertrudae is classified as "not threatened" by the Western Australian Government Department of Parks and Wildlife.

References

gertrudae
Endemic orchids of Australia
Orchids of Western Australia
Plants described in 1920
Endemic flora of Western Australia
Taxa named by Carl Hansen Ostenfeld